Keiko Sofía Fujimori Higuchi (born 25 May 1975) is a Peruvian politician. Fujimori is the eldest daughter of former Peruvian president Alberto Fujimori and Susana Higuchi. From August 1994 to November 2000, she held the role of First Lady of Peru, during her father's administrations. She has served as the leader of the Fujimorist political party Popular Force since 2010, and was a congresswoman representing the Lima Metropolitan Area, from 2006 to 2011. Fujimori ran for president in the 2011, 2016, and 2021 elections, but was defeated each time in the second round of voting.

Early life

Early life and education 
Keiko Sofía Fujimori Higuchi was born on 25 May 1975 in the Jesús María district of Lima, the capital of Peru. Fujimori's parents are Japanese Peruvians; her father is former President of Peru Alberto Fujimori, who was elected in the 1990 Peruvian general election, and her mother is Susana Higuchi. In addition, Fujimori would come to have three siblings: Kenji Gerardo (born May 1980), Hiro Alberto (born December 1976) and Sachi Marcela (born March 1979). Fujimori, as the eldest child in her family, would often mediate between her parents – who experienced a conflicted marriage – and her siblings. For primary and secondary education, Keiko Fujimori and her siblings attended Peruvian Catholic School  (Recoleta Academy of the Sacred Hearts). As she became a teenager, she would often feel that she needed to please her father, according to Vásquez de Velasco, and was able to use publicly funded presidential vehicles, including the presidential jet, for her personal events.

When her father was elected president in 1990, he was reportedly approached by the military to implement Plan Verde; a plan for Peru to adopt a neoliberal economy, to ethnically cleanse vulnerable populations and to establish control of the media. With backing of the military, he later led a self-coup when he dissolved congress in 1992, violating the independence of the judiciary and the press, and began persecuting opponents. Subsequently, with the approval of a new constitution, the president could be re-elected in the following elections. Throughout her father's presidency, the government committed multiple human rights violations that included forced sterilizations, and extrajudicial killings during the internal conflict in Peru. It was also alleged that Fujimori embezzled between US$600 million and US$2 billion through graft. Such allegations placed Fujimori seventh in the list of money embezzled by heads of government active within 1984–2004. Alberto Fujimori's revitalization of the economy of Peru and defeat of Shining Path, however, has resulted in continued support from some Peruvians, with the former president having a divisive legacy overall in the country.

After her father's coup, Fujimori graduated from secondary school and travelled to the United States in 1993 to pursue a bachelor's degree in Business Administration at Stony Brook University. The cost of Fujimori and her sibling's studies in the United States, estimated to be about $918,000 in total, was reportedly funded by Chief of the National Intelligence Service (SIN) Vladimiro Montesinos, with his secretary Matilde Pinchi Pinchi saying Keiko personally received money at SIN facilities while General Julio Salazar would travel to New York to deliver funds on occasion. La Preens would later report that a foundation in Panama was established, received bank transfers from Montesinos' account and paid for Fujimori's studies at Boston University. She would go on to graduate from the university in May 1997, completing her studies in Business Administration.

First Lady of Peru 
In 1994, Fujimori's father stripped her mother of her title of First Lady of Peru with the intent of silencing her after she accused him publicly and in the Peruvian Judicial Branch of kidnapping, torture and corruption, this led to the two separating in the same year, taking with them the last vestiges of her mother's titles. One day shortly after, Fujimori received a call from her father while studying in the United States, with the president asking his daughter to attend a formal dinner in Miami, though this quickly turned into a multi-day trip. On 23 August 1994, Keiko stopped her studies at Stony Brook and returned to Peru, where her father appointed her as First Lady of Peru, the youngest first lady in the Americas. Fujimori's father reportedly used her as an accessory instead of having her perform notable functions, choosing his daughter to fill the office because she was obedient. While serving as First Lady, Fujimori downplayed the allegations raised by her mother, ignoring reports by the press and international groups.

Fujimori's parents formally divorced in 1996. In the years after their separation, Susana said that she was subjected to torture at least five-hundred times between 1992 and 2000, telling the press that Alberto had ordered his partner Vladimiro Montesinos to execute her, though Montesinos said he refused on the ground of being a devout Catholic.

As first lady, she received three main accusations: that she diverted clothing donated through charity by Japanese-Peruvians, a controversy that even made it before Supreme Court of Peru; that she ordered the Government Palace's rooms painted pink; and the perceived betrayal, as it was seen by many opposition members, when she refused to defend her mother who had been denounced and persecuted by her father. Fujimori responded to the last criticism by alleging that the accusations of tortures made by her mother were a "legend." She would later reconcile with her mother, who then assisted her with her presidential campaigns.

In 1998, as her father intended to run for an unprecedented and at that point unconstitutional third term, Fujimori came out in a strong declaration against her father's plan, supporting a plan made by the opposition. She put out a statement: "As a daughter, I would prefer that my father rest, but as a citizen, I believe he is what the country requires." Fujimori still helped her father despite her reservations in his reelection campaign in April 2000, as she had done in his 1995 campaign. In November 2000, her father fled to Japan and resigned from the presidency while visiting Brunei once news came of a massive corruption scandal. Shortly after the scandal broke, Fujimori had asked her father to not renounce anything and to return to Peru to defend himself before a court of law.

Fujimori was forced to leave the Government Palace of Peru on 21 November 2000 after the Congress of Peru officially vacated her father Alberto's position as president of Peru. Her mother, now a member of congress, offered Fujimori to stay with her, though Fujimori refused and preferred to stay with her aunt Juana Fujimori beside her father's family.

United States residency and arrest of her father 
In August 2001, Fujimori visited Tokyo to meet with her father who still had dual citizenship, the main reason Japan was reluctant to reject his asylum and extradite him. She moved to the United States in 2002 to further pursue her business career, studying at Columbia University. While in New York, she met Mark Vito Villanella and married him in a wedding attended by many Fujimorist officials in the Miraflores district of Lima that was officiated by Juan Luis Cipriani Thorne, Archbishop of Lima and member of Opus Dei. The newlyweds returned to New York where Fujimori would continue her MBA studies.

Fujimori's father arrived in Santiago de Chile in preparation of his return to Peru to run anew as a presidential candidate on 6 November 2005 and was arrested shortly after by Interpol. After her father's arrest in Chile, Fujimori's father was blocked from announcing his candidacy for President of Peru in the 2006 Peruvian general election, as was his political coalition Si Cumple.

Congress of Peru (2006–2011) 

As a result of Alberto Fujimori's arrest, those sympathetic to the ex-president created the party Alliance for the Future (Alianza por el Futuro) with the acronym AF recognizing their previous leader. With her father unable to preside over the new party, Keiko Fujimori was chosen as the party's leader and candidate, which resulted with her ending her residency in the United States. It was in this context that she finally returned to the country and ran for Congress in the general elections of 2006. At this time, she would continue to defend the actions of her father and Montesinos.

On 6 January 2006, Keiko managed to get her new party included in the Peruvian Registry of Political Organizations. In that year's legislative elections, she topped the list of her party's candidates. The party's presidential candidate, Martha Chavez Cossio, running with vice presidential candidate Santiago Fujimori (Keiko's uncle), finished in fourth place, with 7.4% of the valid votes. Keiko received the most votes of any congressional candidate that year, with 602,869 votes, more than three times more than the runner up, Mercedes Cabanillas; breaking the national record for most votes received by a legislator up to that point. The Alliance received 1.4 million votes in total, or 13% of all valid votes cast, winning 13 congressional seats and becoming the fourth most powerful party in the Congress. In the night of the first vote, 9 April, Fujimori declared, "I believe that much of the support is because I am the daughter of Alberto Fujimori, and it is obvious that I am really the recipient of the caring and gratefulness that the people have for my father." She would serve as a Member of the National Congress from 26 July 2006 – 26 July 2011 for Lima.

With the election of Alan Garcia to the presidency, Fujimori now became the part of the congressional opposition. Adopting a moderate tone concerning Garcia, who did not have a majority of parliament, Fujimori announced her willingness to cooperate on certain issues. During her term, she played the role of a discreet legislator who was yet a prominent spokesperson for fujimorismo until the role was handed to Carlos Raffo Arce in 2008. Of the only 20 legislative projects she proposed in five years, just 6 were approved. The majority of her proposals concerned reforms of the legal code. Fujimori and her parliamentary bloc supported various government policies, such as their fruitless reform of the Penal Code to reintroduce the death penalty for terrorists. Later, she attempted to reintroduce the death penalty for pedophilia and robbery. She authored a law that restricts penitentiary benefits for those who commit serious offenses, and another law that obligates judges to give the highest sanctions to repeat offenders. Similarly, she passed a law that reduces the jail benefits to those who are protected under the "sincere confession" provision.

In September 2007, she organized demonstrations in support of her father, who was now being judged for his previous crimes. She told the press that she was confident of his acquittal because "there is no hard evidence." Fujimori insisted that her father was unaware of the crimes committed by Montesinos and other public functionaries. In December, the ex-president received his first guilty verdict and was convicted of participating in acts of corruption, murder, human rights abuses, and other charges. His daughter considered the ruling an "injustice", the result of "political and judicial persecution", saying that the Peruvian judiciary "inspires no confidence." The next year, she said that if she was elected president, she would "not hesitate" to use her presidential pardon power on her own father.

On 13 January 2008, Fujimori announced the creation of a new political party, Fuerza 2011, that would nominate a candidate for 2011. It would nominate her if her father was blocked from running by the law. Other Fujimorista organizations, such as Cambio 90 and New Majority, decided to maintain their organizational independence.

In April 2009, Alberto was convicted for another time, this time sentenced for 25 years of prison for crimes against humanity, specifically referring to various massacres, which left 25 people in total dead. Before the ruling, Fujimori had organized another demonstration that had managed to obtain the attendance of 10,000 people, where she challenged the existence of any evidence against her father. She attributed the ruling to "vengeance" against "the best president that we have ever had in the country." In an opinion poll taken at the time, 70% of the population believed that the ex-president was guilty, while just 27% believed he was innocent. At the same time, when asked whether they would support him for president, between 19 and 21% said that they would if he were allowed to run.

Fujimori was criticized for absent from 500 sessions of Congress, according to the publication La República. During this time, she gave birth to two daughters and needed to take maternity leave. Furthermore, she was outside of the country for a total of 223 days between August 2006 and 2010, being her primary trip destinations Chile (5 times) and the United States (10 times), where she spent almost 100 days between January and May 2008 finishing her master's degree in Columbia University. According to the same publication, of the 42 sessions of the commission on the economy in which she was a member, she was only present for 7.

Presidential campaigns

2011 general election 

During 2009, Keiko Fujimori began the collection of signatures to create Fuerza 2011, her own political party. Fujimori hired former New York City mayor Rudy Giuliani as an advisor.

On 9 March 2010, the National Jury of Elections formally recognized the political party after more than one million signatures were collected, a number that surpassed the requirement by 854,000 signatures. On 19 May, she officially launched this new political organization. On 17 December, she announced her candidacy during a campaign in a Lima neighborhood. Rafael Rey Rey, minister of defense, Peruvian representative to the Andean Parliament and member of the conservative party National Renewal, was the first vice-presidential candidate while Jaime Yoshiyama, her father's former minister during his presidency, was the second.

Throughout the entire campaign, Fujimori fiercely defended her various proposals, among them to apply the death penalty to certain crimes, create jobs, fight poverty, control public accounts, sponsor free trade, counter crime, begin an "offensive against corruption", improve the education system via a reward initiative for excellent teachers, and an accompanying system for gauging teacher skills. Her campaign was fundamentally built upon a defense of her father's government. In her opinion, that government had been responsible for defeating terrorism and stabilizing the economy. However, she also found it necessary to distance herself from the scandals that ended up ending the presidency of her father, trying to blame Montesinos for the violations of human rights and corruption while also promising to not pardon her father, a constitutional power of the president. Fujimori also recognized "errors" and "excesses" committed during her father's terms and reminded the public of her opposition to her father's third term.

During the campaign for the first ballot, Fujimori became embroiled in a new scandal as she admitted to having received donations from people allegedly involved in drug trafficking during her run for Congress in 2006. She admitted to having received 10,000 dollars from two convicted women who, according to Fujimori, were victims of persecution.

Opinion polls granted her high possibilities to win the presidential elections in 2011; she was leading in presidential election polls as of July 2010. In the first round of the 2011 presidential elections, Fujimori received 23.551% of the votes (3.4 million), second only to Ollanta Humala, a leftist nationalist candidate who received 31.699% of the votes. Pedro Pablo Kuczynski was third with 18.512%, followed by Alejandro Toledo and Luis Castañeda, ex-mayor of Lima. Kuczynski and Castañeda subsequently declared their support for Fujimori while Toledo declared for Humala. With 37 representatives, Fuerza 2011 became the second most powerful party in congress. Fujimori's brother, Kenji Gerardo Fujimori, was elected representative for Lima, receiving the most votes of any national candidate.

The second vote was polarized. Near election date, polls indicated effectively a tie due to the margin of error. The election was also marked by fearmongering by both sides of the aisle. According to Sinesio Lopez, professor at the Pontifical Catholic University of Peru, "Humala's candidacy fed into fears that his political program would kill small businesses. Keiko's candidacy, meanwhile, fed into fears of a return to corruption and violation of human rights that had occurred during her father's government." Humala was also branded by his opponents as a purportedly Chavista authoritarian. As a result, both were incredibly polarizing figures, with polls showing that both encountered stern rejection from about 50% of the population during the first round of voting. According to the Barcelona Centre for International Affairs, eight million people, mostly centrists and members of the middle class, said they would be electing the "lesser evil" for the nation.

In the 5 June runoff, she lost to Humala, 51.34% (7,937,704 votes) to 48.66% (7,490,647 votes). She had received the majority of her support from the business community, conservatives, the majority of the press, liberal professionals, small businesses, the church, and much of the Lima middle class. With 90% of polls closed, Fujimori admitted her defeat and personally congratulated Humala on his win.

Post-campaign of 2011 
After her 2011 defeat, Fujimori began to work toward a renewed campaign for 2016. Her strategy began with a small change as on 29 June 2012, she announced a new name for her party: Fuerza Popular, a change that officially took effect 4 January 2013. According to her, she had chosen a new name for the party so that it "would be able to last in the times." The logo for her party, orange with a big white "K" (for Keiko), stayed the same. Furthermore, she continued to serve as its president. The new party did not present any declaration of ideology for the electoral authorities, but she seemed to maintain the essence of fujimorismo, including the defense of neoliberal economics, financial stability, and strict security. Despite these continuities, she continued to slowly distance herself from the legacy of her father.

In October 2012, Fujimori and her brothers requested a humanitarian pardon for their father, who, according to the defense, was having health problems. Fujimori herself declared "we are submitting a letter to president Ollanta Humala in order to inform him of this request for freedom. It will be personal letter from four children to inform him of the commencement of this process." In June 2013, Humala denied the request for clemency, alleging that according to a medical professional, the ex-president did not suffer from any terminal illness nor any serious and incurable mental illnesses. In January 2015, her father was convicted for a third time, this time sentenced for eight years for having been guilty for misappropriation of public funds to buy off tabloids for his 2000 election.

Between 2011 and 2016, Fujimori intended to strengthen her party, travelling across the country to mitigate the hesitancy many still had toward her because of her connection to Alberto Fujimori, a factor that had been decisive in her 2011 defeat. She dedicated herself to cutting the association, including by removing corrupt members of her party and reaching out to youth. Her electoral base continued to be in Lima and the center of the country. Although she did not serve out a single public function during this period that could have increased her visibility, Fujimori led all opinion polls throughout 2015, with more than 30% support. She also benefited from an ongoing political crisis and accusations of corruption against Humala that made his approval ratings drop to just 20%.

2016 general election 

On 4 December 2015, Fujimori officially announced her candidacy for president in the 2016 elections. Her running mates were ex-minister of agriculture and irrigation Jose Chilmper Ackerman for first vice president and Vladimiro Huaroc Portocarrero, ex-regional governor of Junin as the second vice president. Fujimori outlined six "pillars", among them defense of institutions of a higher law, independence of powers, protection of human rights, support for limiting the armed forces, a free market, tax cuts, incentives for small businesses, use of emergency state funds to kickstart the economy, increase in supply of government bonds, and expansion of electrical and internet infrastructure in rural areas.

In January 2016, there were 19 presidential candidates, but by the first vote, nine had been expelled or dropped out. Cesar Acuna and Julio Guzman, two of the main competitors, had been excluded according to the National Jury of Elections. The candidacy of Acuna was interrupted because he gave money to the people during the campaign and Guzman was forced out of the race because of questions about whether his party functioned democratically. Fujimori was not free of accusations as the JNE also requested her removal from the election after it came to light that she had received donations larger than those allowed by the election laws. Fujimori countered that the accusations against her were "irresponsible" and alleged insufficient evidence. The JNE dismissed the claims as unfounded, declaring that "The candidate has not engaged in the prohibited activities of offering or giving money or gifts in the aim of obtaining votes." The outcome provoked suspicions that the original exclusionary rulings had been made in favor of Fujimori's candidacy, calling into question the clarity of the system for applying the election rules.

As the first vote arrived, Fujimori maintained her lead over her competitors. With Acuña and Guzmán's disqualifications, her main opponents were now the center-right economist and former minister Pedro Pablo Kuczynski (PPK), the left-leaning psychologist and congresswoman Veronika Mendoza, and the former delegate Alfredo Barnechea. Also in the ring were Alan Garcia and Alejandro Toledo, ex-presidents whose prospects were dim because of investigations and revelations connecting them to Operation Car Wash.

On the anniversary of the self-coup of 1992, more than 50,000 demonstrators, most of them called by the non-profit organization No a Keiko, protested Fujimori's candidacy with chants such as "Fujimori never more" in the Plaza San Martin. As she had done in the previous elections, she promised to not pardon her father, but promised also to continue the struggle in court for his release; she also affirmed that this was a decision taken by the whole family, not just herself. Fujimori maintained a high level of disapproval, approximately 45% according to Ipsos, deriving mainly from the negative legacy of her father who was again seeking freedom and appeals for his sentence. The appeals process intensified, bringing Keiko to distance herself from the controversial shadow of her father, vowing to not follow his path, to provide reparations to women who were allegedly sterilized under her father, and to promise to not pardon him for his crimes, signing a document during a debate symbolizing her promise. She also stated that she would not run for another election if she won the presidency. She also supported the Truth and Reconciliation Commission, responsible for detailing the human rights violations committed between 1980 and 2000 by both the Shining Path Insurgency and the government, for the first time.

Polls indicated that she placed first in the first round of voting on 10 April, garnering approximately 40% of the vote over opponents Pedro Pablo Kuczynski and Verónika Mendoza who each received approximately 20%. Fuerza Popular obtained an absolute majority in the congress, garnering 73 of 130 available seats. After learning of the results, Fujimori said, "The new political map that has been drawn clearly shows us that Peru wants reconciliation and does not want any more violence." However, as no candidate had obtained a majority of votes for president, a second vote would be scheduled for 5 June.

In this next stage of the campaign, Fujimori traveled across the country, especially to where her father continued to maintain a steady level of popularity, while PPK talked about possible allies and intended to present himself as a centrist candidate capable of winning over the antifujimorista vote. Fujimori continued to be the favorite according to polls, but her campaign suffered a major setback: as the election approached, accusations surfaced of connections between drug trafficking and Congressman Joaquín Ramírez, Secretary General of Fuerza Popular and one of Fujimori's principle aids. On 15 May 2016, Peruvian news program Cuarto Poder broadcast a report conducted with Univisión that alleging that Ramírez was being investigated by the DEA for money laundering. According to the report, the DEA had a recording in which Ramirez told a commercial pilot, "Do you know that China [referring to Keiko] gave me 15 million dollars during the last campaign in order to "clean" them for the 2011 campaign, and that I 'cleaned' them through a chain of faucets?" The DEA denied that there was any investigation into Fujimori, who denied any involvement in the case or having in fact ever given any money to Ramirez.

Her image continue to take a hit, primarily due to fears that the country would turn into a narco-state with her election, fears that were stoked by her rival PPK. At the same time, prosecutors announced they would be investigating suspicions of money laundering and other irregularities in Fujimori's campaign, which she dismissed as simply a smear campaign. In the final days before the vote, the leaders of the left, such as Mendoza, announced their support for PPK. At the beginning of June, another march organized by several left-leaning organizations against Fujimori garnered thousands of demonstraters in Lima, an event shared considerably via social media under the title "it is not hate, it is love for Peru." According to analysts, this second march was decisive in those not yet decided showing support for the PPK.

In a very contested election, Fujimori trailed Pedro Pablo Kuczynski according to exit polls as ballots were counted late into the evening on 5 June 2016. The recount took up copious amounts of time after election day. Due to the narrow margin involved, the national (and international, to a lesser degree) press only began to consider PPK as the new "virtual president" on 9 June, four days after the original vote. At that point, PPK had obtained 50.12% of the vote, compared with 49.88% for Fujimori. On 10 June, Fujimori admitted her defeat, saying that her party had a "vigilant" opposition and wishing the new president elect well. On the other hand, Fujimori also claimed that the PPK had won with the help of "promoters of hatred" and "the political, economic, and media power of the outgoing government." Kuczynski had won by a narrow margin of less than half a percentage point, and was sworn in as president on 28 July.

Post-campaign of 2016 

After the 2016 elections, Fujimori continued to be the main leader of the opposition against PPK's government presiding over the parliamentary majority, while defending herself from accusations of having maintained a controversial relationship with the Odebrecht conglomerate. In December 2017, she supported the first impeachment process against Pedro Pablo Kuczynski, though he pardoned her father Alberto Fujimori on 24 December 2018 three days after the impeachment process failed.

Her brother, Kenji Fujimori, declared his opposition to such a move, which worsened a growing rift between the siblings over their father's legacy and control of the opposition. In March 2018, PPK resigned having been accused of buying votes against his impeachment. At the time, Kenji was recorded negotiating for votes in favor of PPK's acquittal, dubbed his kenjivideos, in return for a pardon for his father, a deal which PPK ended up following through with. When she found out about the videos, Keiko, accused of being partly responsible for the leak of the recordings, condemned her brother's actions. Upon his expulsion from Congress in June 2018, Kenji responded, "Keiko, congratulations! Here you have my head on a platter." During the second round of elections in 2016, Kenji did not vote for his own sister because he refused to compromise on the freedom of their father or have a discourse on his errors. When he lost a challenge to become leader of Fuerza Popular, Kenji promised to run for president in 2021, something that his sister was also planning to do for the third time, this time in a new party that would split from Fuerza Popular along with other dissidents in the party.

When PPK resigned on 23 March 2017, the presidency was passed to civil engineer Martín Vizcarra, with Fujimori welcoming him and wished for his "success" through a tweet the same day. Nevertheless, she heavily criticized Vizcarra's 2018 Peruvian constitutional referendum since included on the ballot was whether citizens supported the re-election of congressmen and the return of a bicameral legislature. She claimed that the ballot items "are evidence of centrist populism", asked the president to "stop seeing congress members as your enemies", and was empowered to make as the parliamentary majority leader to attempt to defeat the measures through the referendum.

Arrest and temporary imprisonment 

On 10 October 2018, Fujimori was arrested and placed in provisional detention on charges of money laundering days after the Supreme Court of Peru nullified the pardon of her father, ordering him back to prison. The arrest came at the request of the Public Ministry, who accused her of illegally receiving money from Odebrecht during her campaign in 2011 as part of the Lava Jato corruption scandal. The arrest order stated that she led a "criminal organization inside of Fuerza 2011 [today Fuerza Popular]." In response, Fujimori wrote, "this is what we call political persecution ... without evidence against me, I am deprived of liberty, but still with my head held high and my spirit intact." On 18 October, she was let go as her appeal was accepted by the National Audience. On 31 October, she was arrested again when she was again sentenced to 3 years of pretrial detention for money laundering and "a high risk of escaping", as per the decision by judge Richard Concepcion Carhuancho.

Fujimori appealed yet again to be set free but the appeal was rejected by the Superior Court of Justice in January 2019. By August of that year, the Supreme Court, due to an impasse between its members, delayed their decision on her appeal. During the investigations, in September, the publication La Republica revealed that Fujimori had used a pseudonym together with the rest of her party's leadership in a Telegram group chat called "Titanic Group" where she made the most important party decisions under the name Ruth. By the beginning of December, Jose Camayo, a businessman investigated for the "White Collar Port" case involved with Fuerza Popular, declared before the Operation Car Wash Special Team that Señora K, a person accused of corruption, was in fact Keiko Fujimori herself, something that was later denied by her, and yet still had a significant impact on the ongoing investigation.

In January 2020, the tribunal decided, four votes to three, to grant her habeas corpus on the grounds that the preventative detention sentence was invalid for its violation of her liberty. Shortly afterward, her husband Mark Vito began a hunger strike in a camp installed in front of the prison where she was detained. On 28 January, the judge Victor Zuniga Urday re-imposed a preventive prison for 15 months on the charges of money laundering from the Odebrecht company. On 30 April 2020, a Peruvian appeals court overturned her 15-month detention order and granted her a conditional release from prison. She was finally released on bail on 5 May 2020.

2021 general election 

After a few months out of the spotlight despite still leading her party, on 25 September 2020, she announced her total return to politics. A month later, 30 November, still under investigation by the Operation Car Wash team, she tweeted that she was officially announcing her candidacy as the Fuerza Popular's presidential candidate with her ballot partners ex-congressional president Luis Galarreta as first vice president and the former lawyer and director of National Solidarity, Patricia Juarez as second vice president. Fujimori's party helped lead the controversial removal of Martín Vizcarra and his replacement by Manuel Merino, which resulted with the peaceful 2020 Peruvian protests. The protests were violently put down, resulting in the deaths of Brian Pintado and Inti Sotelo. Shortly after their deaths, Fujimori lamented what had happened and also considered the current situation as "unsustainable", calling for Merino to step down or else he "should be censured right here right now", a move she believed a majority of Congress would support.

On 9 December, she officially won the internal party elections to be come Fuerza Popular's candidate for the 2021 election. The campaign got off to a rocky start as on the same day as a victory, a poll by Peru21 released a national Datum poll which revealed that 63% of Peruvians said they would "never vote" for her. Then, on 21 December, the National Jury of Elections declared that Fuerza Popular's presidential board was "inadmissible" and gave them two days to follow their instructions. In the end, the board was finally revised and admitted.

She has said that she wanted to be a president with a "heavy hand" and "authority", proposing increased legal protection on law enforcement. She has called for the construction of more prisons to reduce overcrowding and to offer more instances of probation for small crime offenders. In a break with previous elections in which she promised not to pardon her father, Fujimori emphasized her closeness to his legacy during this election, stating that "after conversations that I have had with my father, through letters and during the year he's recently had in freedom, we've been able to get much closer and understand things about each other" as well as expressing that his presidency "was not a dictatorship, despite some moments of authoritarianism", and making clear a renewed promise to pardon her father if elected. She proposed a large stimulus to voters that would represent three percent of Peru's annual gross domestic product, possibly increasing the low national debt that exists in Peru.

Throughout the presidential campaign, she was among the frontrunners in opinion polling. Following the first round election, Fujimori gave a speech in which she framed the runoff as a battle between "markets and Marxism", framing her second round opponent Pedro Castillo as a communist. Americas Society/Council of the Americas wrote that a Fujimori presidency would bring the appearance of maintaining the status quo in Peru, but it would make the nation "far from stable."

Election aftermath 
After Castillo took the lead during the ballot-counting process in the second round of elections, Fujimori disseminated unsubstantiated claims of electoral fraud. According to The Guardian, various international observers countered Fujimori's claims, stating that the election process was conducted in accordance with international standards, with electoral observers from the Inter-American Union of Electoral Organizations, the Organization of American States, and the Progressive International denying any instances of widespread fraud while also praising the accuracy of the elections.

Fujimori's statements about possibly overturning the election were described as being inspired by the attempts to overturn the 2020 United States presidential election by former U.S. president Donald Trump. The Guardian also reported that analysts and political observers criticized Fujimori's remarks, noting that it made her appear desperate after losing her third presidential run in a ten-year period. If elected into the presidency, criminal investigations against Fujimori would have been suspended until July 2026, with Anne Applebaum writing in The Atlantic that "the personal stakes are high. ... Fujimori previously spent a year in jail while awaiting trial for allegedly collecting illegal campaign contributions, and she could conceivably be sent back."

In December 2021, prosecutor José Domingo Pérez reported that Fujimori received one million dollars from the Odebrecht Department of Structured Operations that was delivered through offshore intermediary accounts of Gonzalo Monteverde's company Construmaq. Domingo stated that he held 1,900 pieces of evidence to determine that a criminal group existed within Popular Force.

Next general election 

On 27 December 2022, General Secretary of Popular Force Luis Galarreta suggested that Fujimori is preparing to be a candidate in Peru's next presidential election, despite her denial of interest in running. The statement was seen as a possible accidental admission of her plans, since she had previously denied interest in running again after her losses in 2011 and 2016 before ultimately doing so.

Public and political image 
Fujimori has continued to promote her father's ideology of Fujimorism within Peru and her political career was her father's idea. The New York Times wrote that her political movement was created "to help whitewash" her father Alberto's legacy. She has been described as having an authoritarian, centre-right, right-wing populist, and far-right political ideology. According to Fujimori, she believes in leading Peru with a "heavy hand" and that democracy "cannot be weak ... must be supported by a solid principle of authority." If on one hand fujimoristas have the support of at least 10.9% of the population, on the other there also exists "antifujimorismo", a group of activists who strongly reject the legacy of her father and see in his daughter not only a threat but a complete reversal of democracy, and that is considered one of the most important political forces in Peru, despite her attempts to craft her image as a moderate.

Defeated in the 1990 elections by Alberto Fujimori, writer and politician Mario Vargas Llosa has been one of the voices most critical of Keiko, although his opinion of her has evolved over time. During her candidacy in the 2011 Peruvian general election, Vargas Llosa said "the worst option is that of Keiko Fujimori because it means the legitimation of one of the worst dictatorships that Peru has had in its history", while during her candidacy for the 2016 Peruvian general election, he stated that "Keiko is the daughter of a murderer and a thief who is imprisoned, tried by civil courts with international observers, sentenced to 25 years in prison for murderer and thief. I do not want her to win the elections." When Fujimori faced far-left candidate Pedro Castillo in 2021, Vargas Llosa endorsed her as the "lesser of two evils", a position criticized as being "the neoliberal right ... allied with authoritarian Fujimori" by Argentine newspaper Página/12, who said the writer was "betting on fear and resuscitating an anti-communist coalition."

Michael Shifter, professor and president of Interamerican Dialogue, admitted that Fujimori has "definite political skill" and "has constructed a base of support." However, he considers the holdover of many of her father's officials in her own team as something that "generates resistance in parts of society that still have very bad memories from years defined by violation of human rights, corruption, and a polarized political climate."

According to a poll taken by Ipsos in March 2016, 27% of voters "definitely would not vote" for her. Fujimori's Popular Force party, which held a plurality within the Congress of the Republic of Peru until its dissolution in 2019, has little public support in Peru. In early 2018, Fujimori saw approval rating of about 30%. By July 2018, her public approval had dropped to 14% and her disapproval had increased to more than 88%, with the drop in her approval rating being correlated with allegations that placed her in the midst of the Odebrecht scandal. Prior to first round presidential elections in 2021, Ipsos polls found that 66.3% of respondents definitely would not vote for her, 7.1% probably would not vote for her, 16.3% probably would vote for her, and 7% definitely would vote for her.

References

Bibliography

External links 
 Biography in-depth by CIDOB Foundation 
 Analysis of Keiko Fujimori by Washington Office on Latin America (WOLA)
 Official site of his period 2006–2011 in the Congress of the Republic of Peru 

1975 births
Boston University School of Management alumni
Candidates for President of Peru
Children of national leaders
Columbia Business School alumni
First Ladies of Peru
Keiko
Fujimorista politicians
Living people
Members of the Congress of the Republic of Peru
Official social partners of national leaders
Peruvian anti-communists
Peruvian politicians of Japanese descent
Peruvian women in business
21st-century Peruvian politicians
21st-century Peruvian women politicians
Anti-abortion activists
Politicians from Lima
Peruvian women activists
Women members of the Congress of the Republic of Peru